Monday is an unincorporated community in Franklin County, in the U.S. state of Missouri.

History
A post office called Monday was established in 1900, and remained in operation until 1908. C. M. Munday, an early postmaster, gave the community his last name.

References

Unincorporated communities in Franklin County, Missouri
Unincorporated communities in Missouri